Bulbophyllum sect. Hoplandra is a section of the genus Bulbophyllum.

Description
Species in this section have basal node of the pedicel is level to above the attachment of the floral bract.

Distribution
Plants from this section are found from Papua New Guinea to Southeast Asia.

Species
Bulbophyllum section Hoplandra comprises the following species:

References

Orchid subgenera